Aparadhi (translation : The Criminal) is a 1949 Hindi social thriller drama film directed by Yeshwant Pethkar for Prabhat Film Company. It starred Madhubala, Ram Singh and Pran. The film's story and dialogue were by Yeshwant Pethkar with music by Sudhir Phadke and lyrics by Amar Varma.

The film is set during the Pre-Independence days and revolves around a husband who suspects his wife of having an affair with a freedom fighter sheltering with them.

Plot
Sheela Rani lives with her blind father and works as a radio singer. Master Amar is a Physical Instructor who falls in love with Sheela when he hears her on the radio. He pursues her and they get married. Mohan, a freedom fighter takes shelter with them when he is on the run from the police. Soon, Amar starts suspecting his wife of having an affair with Mohan. He starts ill-treating his pregnant wife and throws her out of the house. The wife lives with her father where a child is born to her. Amar then proceeds to abduct the child and thinks of getting the Rs. 5000 prize that the police have placed on Mohan. Mohan is arrested and Amar repents his deeds. He realises his mistake and brings his wife home.

Cast
 Madhubala as Sheela Rani
 Ramsingh as Master Amar
 Pran as Mohan
 Leela Pandey]as freedom fighter
 Uma Dutt as police inspector
 Srinivas Joshi
 Gauri
 Manjrekar

Review
Aparadhi got a poor review from the reviewer of Filmindia with the review titled "Poor story with poorer direction" and calling it "Bankrupt direction". The story was cited as being "very thin" with weak screenplay. The music lacked appeal and a song item in Zulu style was especially panned as not required in an "essentially Indian setting". Madhubala was praised and stated to be the "only silver lining".

Soundtrack
The music director was Sudhir Phadke, with lyrics by Amar Varma. The playback singers were Sitara Kanpur and G. M. Durrani.

Song list

References

External links

1940s Hindi-language films
1949 films
1940s thriller drama films
Indian thriller drama films
Indian black-and-white films
1949 drama films